Carlos Alcántara Cuevas (born 1 February 1985) is a Spanish footballer who plays for CAP Ciudad de Murcia as a left-back.

Club career
Born in Zarandona, Region of Murcia, Alcántara signed with Villarreal CF in 2004, spending the vast majority of his spell with the reserves and appearing in five La Liga games over the course of two seasons. His debut came on 17 October 2004, when he featured the full 90 minutes in a 1–1 away draw against RCD Mallorca.

Subsequently, Alcántara joined Deportivo de La Coruña, never appearing officially during his two-year stint and being loaned to two clubs in the Segunda División B, for which he also played sparingly. In the 2008–09 campaign, he represented another side at that level, CF Atlético Ciudad.

After a spell in Hungary with Ferencvárosi TC, Alcántara returned to his country and joined Alicante CF also in division three. He continued to compete in that tier the following years, representing CD Leganés, CD Alcoyano, SD Logroñés, La Hoya Lorca CF, CD Eldense and La Roda CF.

References

External links

Stats at HLSZ 

1985 births
Living people
Spanish footballers
Footballers from Murcia
Association football defenders
La Liga players
Segunda División B players
Tercera División players
Tercera Federación players
Divisiones Regionales de Fútbol players
Villarreal CF B players
Villarreal CF players
Deportivo de La Coruña players
Real Jaén footballers
FC Cartagena footballers
CF Atlético Ciudad players
Alicante CF footballers
CD Leganés players
CD Alcoyano footballers
SD Logroñés players
Lorca FC players
CD Eldense footballers
La Roda CF players
CD Cieza players
Nemzeti Bajnokság I players
Ferencvárosi TC footballers
Spanish expatriate footballers
Expatriate footballers in Hungary
Spanish expatriate sportspeople in Hungary